Emilia Elisabeth Brodin (née Appelqvist; born 11 February 1990) is a Swedish footballer who played as a midfielder for the Damallsvenskan team Djurgårdens IF. She joined previous club Piteå IF for the 2014 season, having been on loan from Tyresö FF for the second part of the 2013 season. She has also played top-level club football for Bälinge IF and AIK. Appelqvist made her debut for the Sweden women's national football team in February 2014.

Club career
Brodin, a defensive central midfielder, began her senior career with local team Bälinge IF. In October 2007, at the age of 17, she was given a four-year contract with the club and was described by the coach as a future national team player.

Brodin spent three seasons with Bälinge before their relegation from the Damallsvenskan in 2008. Ahead of the 2009 season, she rejected an offer from Tyresö FF and joined AIK instead. When AIK suffered relegation in 2010, a disappointed Brodin moved to Tyresö explaining that she had to keep playing Damallsvenskan football to be considered for the national team.

Tyresö won the Damallsvenskan title for the first time in the 2012 season and Brodin collected her first league winner's medal. With competition for places increasingly fierce at Tyresö, Brodin moved to Piteå on loan during the 2013 mid-season break.

In November 2013 Brodin made her transfer to Piteå permanent, despite reported interest from other clubs. After helping Piteå to a third-place finish in 2015, she left for Djurgårdens IF, explaining that the social aspect of living back in Stockholm had attracted her.

A serious knee injury sustained in January 2017 ruled Brodin out of the entire 2017 Damallsvenskan season and UEFA Women's Euro 2017. Although that was the final year of her Djurgårdens contract, she was happy to sign a one-year extension in October 2017 and expected to be back to full fitness in 2018.

In March 2018 Brodin announced that she was pregnant with her first child. Although she had already resumed training after her knee injury, she was forced to put her football comeback plans on hold.

International career
As a Swedish under-19 international, Brodin played the 2009 U-19 European Championship where she was chosen one of the Top 10 players by UEFA.com as well as the 2010 U-20 World Cup, serving as the team's captain. At the latter competition Brodin played every minute of Sweden's campaign, which ended with a 2–0 defeat by Colombia in the quarter-final.

In February 2010, Brodin and Antonia Göransson were called up to train with the senior national team for the Algarve Cup. By June 2013, Brodin had collected 11 caps for Sweden at the Under-23 level. National coach Pia Sundhage called Brodin up to a senior team training camp at Bosön in November 2013.

Brodin made her debut for the senior Sweden team in a 3–0 friendly defeat by France in Amiens on 8 February 2014. In May 2015, Brodin and Piteå teammate Hilda Carlén were both confirmed in Sweden's squad for the 2015 FIFA Women's World Cup in Canada.

On 8 April 2016, Brodin scored her first goal for the Swedish national senior team, making it 1–0 as Sweden beat Slovakia 3–0 in Poprad during a qualifying game for the 2017 European Championship in the Netherlands. Despite requiring surgery on a meniscus injury in mid-May 2016, Brodin was named in Sweden's 18-player squad for the 2016 Summer Olympics. She described her selection as a "dream come true". She made a 15-minute substitute appearance against hosts Brazil in a disappointing 5–1 defeat, then started the semi-final victory over the same opposition as Sweden ultimately secured silver medals.

International goals

Personal life
In July 2017, Brodin married her childhood sweetheart Daniel Brodin, a professional ice hockey player for Djurgårdens IF Hockey of the Swedish Hockey League. In September 2018 she gave birth to the couple's first child, a daughter named Mila Ida.

Honours

Club
 Tyresö FF
 Damallsvenskan: 2012

International
 Summer Olympic Games: Silver medal, 2016

References

External links

Profile  at SvFF

Profile at Swedish Football Association 
 

1990 births
Living people
Footballers from Uppsala
Swedish women's footballers
Sweden women's international footballers
AIK Fotboll (women) players
Tyresö FF players
Piteå IF (women) players
Damallsvenskan players
Bälinge IF players
2015 FIFA Women's World Cup players
Footballers at the 2016 Summer Olympics
Djurgårdens IF Fotboll (women) players
Olympic footballers of Sweden
Medalists at the 2016 Summer Olympics
Olympic silver medalists for Sweden
Olympic medalists in football
Women's association football midfielders